Le Hommet-d'Arthenay is a former commune in the Manche department in north-western France. On 1 January 2018, it was merged into the commune of Pont-Hébert.

See also
Communes of the Manche department

References

Hommetdarthenay